TouchWiz was a user interface developed by Samsung Electronics Co., Ltd with partners, featuring a full touch user interface. It is sometimes incorrectly referred to as an operating system. TouchWiz is used internally by Samsung for smartphones, feature phones and tablet computers, and is not available for licensing by external parties. The Android version of TouchWiz also comes with the Samsung-made app store Galaxy Apps (Galaxy Store). It was replaced by Samsung Experience in 2017 with the release of Android 7.1.1 “Nougat”.

History

Overview 
The first, original, edition of TouchWiz was released in 2009. This 1.0 version was officially launched with the original Samsung Solstice in 2009. The latest version of TouchWiz is TouchWiz 6.0, which is on the Samsung Galaxy J1 mini Prime and TouchWiz 5.0 on the Samsung Galaxy J3 (2016) feature a more refined user interface as compared to the previous versions found on Samsung's older phones released prior to Galaxy S5's release. The status bar is now transparent during home screen mode in TouchWiz Nature UX 2.0 and TouchWiz Nature UX 2.5. In TouchWiz 4.0 on Galaxy S II and the Galaxy Note (both later updated to Nature UX), some of the features added include panning and tilt, which makes use of the accelerometer and gyroscope in the phone to detect motion.

TouchWiz is used by Samsung's own proprietary operating systems, Bada and REX, as well as by phones based on the Android operating system prior to Android Nougat. It is also present in phones running the Tizen operating system.

TouchWiz was abandoned by Samsung in late 2016 in favor of Samsung Experience. 

TouchWiz was a central issue in the legal battle between Apple and Samsung.

TouchWiz 1.0
This was the original edition of TouchWiz, released in 2008, with pre-introduction (trial) on the SGH-F480. This version is officially launched with the original Samsung Solstice in 2009. Various versions of TouchWiz 1.0, with different features, were used on Solstice's siblings such as the Samsung Eternity, Impression, Impact and Highlight.

TouchWiz 2.0
This was the original second edition of TouchWiz, released in 2009. This version premiered with the Samsung Solstice 2 in 2010.

TouchWiz 3.0

Released in 2010, to support Android Eclair (2.1) and Android Froyo (2.2). This version premiered with the Samsung Galaxy S. A lite version of TouchWiz 3.0, with reduced features, was used on the Samsung Galaxy Proclaim.

TouchWiz 4.0

The second version of TouchWiz was released in 2011, to support Android Gingerbread and Android Honeycomb (2.3 - 3.2.6). The Galaxy S II was the first device preloaded with TouchWiz 4.0. This version includes better hardware acceleration than 3.0, as well multiple touchscreen options involving multi-touch gestures and using the phone's accelerometer. One such feature allows users to place two fingers on the screen and tilt the device towards and away from themselves, to zoom in and out, respectively. "Panning" on TouchWiz 4.0 allows users to scroll through home screens by moving the device from side to side.

TouchWiz Nature UX
The third version of TouchWiz was renamed to TouchWiz Nature UX. It was released in 2012 and supported Android Ice Cream Sandwich (4.0). The Galaxy S III, Galaxy Star and Galaxy Note 10.1 were the first devices preloaded with this version, although a "lite" version was used beforehand on the Samsung Galaxy Tab 2 7.0. The 2013 Galaxy S2 "Plus" variant featured this user interface as well.

TouchWiz Nature UX contains more interactive elements than previous version, such as a water ripple effect on the lock screen, and "smart stay", a feature which uses eye tracking technology to determine if the user is still watching the screen. Users are able to set custom vibration patterns for phone calls and notifications. The keyboard software is equipped with a clipboard manager.

A pinch-to-zoom magnification feature and a picture-in-picture mode ("pop-up play") have been added to the precluded video player, as well as panning and zooming motion gestures in the gallery software.

To complement the TouchWiz interface, and as a response to Apple's Siri, this version introduced S Voice, Samsung's intelligent personal assistant.

The colour palette of the user interface has been adapted to the colours of nature, prominently green (plants, forest, grass) and blue (ocean, sky), to visually represent the slogan “Inspired by Nature”.

This version of TouchWiz also utilized many colour gradients.

Criticism has been aimed at the inability of the home screen and lock screen to work in horizontal display orientation.

Premium suite upgrade 
With the Android 4.1 update (pre-installed on the Galaxy Note II), Samsung delivered a "premium suite upgrade", whose improvements include a split screen mode, making this the first mobile user interface to run more than one application simultaneously.

Other additions and accessibility improvements are "easy mode", a simplified home screen option with larger icons, "smart rotation", where the screen rotates after the orientation of the user's face detected through the front camera, a low-light shot mode, the ability to adjust the volume of each side of headphones separately, a "reader mode" for Samsung Internet (formerly known as "S Browser") with adjustable font size, "Page Buddy", which can detect the user's intended action such as opening the music player when plugging in earphones, and the ability to read the news feed from Facebook in particular directly from the lock screen well before common lock screen notifications were released with Android 5.0 "Lollipop".

TouchWiz Nature UX 2.0

This version supports Android Jellybean (4.2.2) and was released in 2013; the Samsung Galaxy S4 was the first device to use TouchWiz Nature UX 2.0. Even more eye tracking abilities were introduced with this version, such as "smart scroll", which allows users to scroll down and up on webpages by tilting their head downwards and upwards, respectively.

The on-screen buttons for photo, video and modes now have a metallic texture, and both photo and video recording modes are combined into one viewfinder page rather than separated by switching modes.

The audio setting (mute / vibrate / sound) is also accessible from the device options (power off / restart / data network mode / flight mode) which is accessed through holding the power button.

With Android 4.4 KitKat, which rolled out in February 2014 to Samsung Galaxy devices, the colours of the green battery icon, as well as the green (upstream) and orange (downstream) indicator arrows in the top status bar have been changed to grey.

Touchwiz Nature UX 2.5

TouchWiz Nature UX 2.5 was released in 2013 to support the last updates to Android Jellybean (4.1–4.3), and was first used on the Galaxy Note 3 and the Galaxy Note 10.1 2014 Edition. This version completely supports the Samsung Knox security solution, as well as multi-user capabilities. The camera was also improved in this update: shutter lag was reduced, and features like a 360° panorama mode were added. The settings menu is equipped with a new search feature.

It is the first mobile user interface to feature windowing. To the existing split-screen feature, the abilities to drag and drop items inbetween and open select apps twice was added.

A vertical one-handed operation mode has been added for the Galaxy Note 3. It can be accessed with a swiping gesture on either side of the screen and allows variably shrinking the simulated size of the screen. It also is equipped with on-screen navigation (options, home, back) and volume keys (up, down).

TouchWiz Nature UX 3.0

This update was released in 2014 to support Android KitKat (4.4). It was first seen on the Galaxy S5, Galaxy K Zoom and the Galaxy Note Pro 12.2. It later appeared on the Galaxy Alpha.

The home screen and settings menu were made more user-friendly with larger icons and less clutter. Also, icons in the context menus were removed for minimalism, and any disabled options, where previously they would have been visible but unusable (grayed out), now do not show up at all.

The one-handed operation mode available on the Galaxy S5 allows setting shortcuts for apps and contacts. A floating menu with user-specified app shortcuts has also been added.

The new colour palette utilizes oceanic colours (e.g. #006578, #00151C, #004754, #009ba1, #005060, #0034da and #001d27) to reference the Galaxy S5's water resistance.

Some budget devices, such as the Samsung Galaxy Trend 2 Lite, Galaxy J1 Ace, Galaxy V Plus, Galaxy Grand Neo Plus and Galaxy Tab E feature a reduced version of TouchWiz Nature UX 3.0 called "TouchWiz Essence UX", which is adapted for devices with less than 1 GB of RAM. This version has an  ultra-power-saving mode, which drastically extends the battery duration by making the screen grayscale, restricting the apps that can be used, and turning off features like Wi-Fi and Bluetooth.

The redesigned settings menu has flat icons instead of previously used self-coloured clip-art, and is equipped with three distinct viewing modes: Grid view, List view and Tab view.

Another minor distinction is that the boot screen shows the Android trademark, but no longer the model number of the device (e.g. SM-G900F, SM-G901F).

TouchWiz Nature UX 3.5
This is a slightly modified version of TouchWiz Nature UX 3.0, released in 2014 for the Galaxy Note 4, Galaxy Note Edge and Galaxy A-series (2015). Most of the changes made were minor, aesthetic ones, including an overhaul of the cluttered settings menu, the inclusion of quick setting shortcuts and centralization of the lock screen clock. However, the camera application was stripped down to its most basic features, removing features such as the WiFi Direct-powered remote viewfinder, nonetheless gaining an AF/AE lock feature accessible through tapping and holding in the camera viewfinder.

The "grid view" setting menu viewing mode introduced in TouchWiz Nature UX 3.0 has been removed. Menus and system applications use white instead of dark backgrounds. The recent task switcher has changed into a vertically scrollable list with overlapping thumbnails, while a flat list with non-overlapping thumbnails with orientation-based scrolling direction had been used previously.

The ability to use shortcuts for apps and contacts in the one-handed operation mode has been removed.

TouchWiz Nature UX 4.0
This version comes with Galaxy S5, and so supports Android Lollipop and was released in 2014. Update 4.0 eventually became available to the Galaxy S4, Galaxy Note 3 (2013) and Galaxy S5 and Note 4 (2014), and other Lollipop-compatible devices, but with fewer features.

This version of TouchWiz continued the design that was initially seen on the Galaxy S5, with slightly more rounded icons, but also incorporated Lollipop's additions and changes, such as making the notification drop-down menu merely an overlay instead of a full-screen drawer and colouring it neon blue. TouchWiz Nature UX 4.0 also included a visual overhaul for the whole system, changing the black background in system apps to a white theme, similar to TouchWiz Nature UX 3.5 seen on the Note 4 & A series. The black theme had been in place since the original Galaxy S, because it reduced battery consumption as Samsung mainly uses AMOLED display technology. It was changed because of a patent licensing deal with Google, which required that the TouchWiz interface follow the design of "stock" Android more closely.

The size of the current video file and the remaining space storage amount is no longer indicated in the camera software viewfinder during video recording, and the audio controls (silent, vibration only, on) have been removed from the power menu.

TouchWiz 5.0
With TouchWiz 5.0, Samsung reverted to the earlier, simpler naming system, without the "Nature UX" infix, to reflect aesthetic changes. This version was released in 2015 primarily for the Samsung Galaxy S6, and supports later updates to Android Lollipop (5.0.2–5.1.1). This update cleaned up the user interface, reduced the number of duplicate functions, and used brighter and simpler colours with icon shadows. Many icons in top bars have been replaced with uppercase text labels such as "".

A new version of TouchWiz 5.0 was released in September 2015 for the Galaxy Note 5 and S6 Edge+. The new version features updated iconography, with stock apps now featuring "squircle" icons instead of freeform, and a re-added single-handed operation mode that was removed on the Galaxy S6 after being available on the S5. However, it is opened with a triple-press of the home button instead of a swiping gesture, lacks on-screen keys (navigation, volume controls, app/contact shortcuts) and only has one fixed size.

The camera user interface has undergone several changes as well. Shortcuts on the left pane are no longer customizable, and the settings are on a separate page rather than on top of an active viewfinder.

Mid-range and entry-level devices feature a version named "TouchWiz Essence 2.0". It is similar to TouchWiz 5.0 but icon shadows are not included along with or without Theme Support. It is comparatively lighter, faster and featured on devices such as the 2016 A series, Galaxy A8, Galaxy S5 Neo, tablets and the J series devices which run Android Lollipop. It also doesn't feature the Sparkling Bubbles lockscreen effect exclusive to Galaxy S6 devices and the Note 5.

Galaxy S6 user reports suggest that the step-by-step frame navigation and still frame image extraction features have been removed from Samsung's precluded video player software.

TouchWiz 6.0
This version of TouchWiz began during initial beta testing of Android Marshmallow on the Galaxy S6 in December 2015, for users who had signed up for the beta program, and became formally available in February 2016. 

It features a redesigned notification drop-down and colour overhaul, replacing the original blue and green hue to white. This version also removed the weather while centring and enlarging the clock on the lock screen, as well as bringing back the ability to customize the shortcuts on the lock screen. Icons are slightly modified with a flatter look, removing the shadows that featured previously. The Smart Manager was removed as an app, and was moved to a settings option instead.

On this version, Samsung also added accessibility options such as Show button shapes, where buttons are outlined with a visible border and a shaded background to increase contrast from the background, and the ability  change the display density setting, although this was initially only accessible through a third-party app as the setting was hidden by the system. An update to the Galaxy S7 and S7 Edge made it official, allowing users to change it under the display settings.

TouchWiz 6.0 also includes Google's additions to Android: Doze and App Standby to improve battery performance (although Samsung's own app optimization feature remains available, thus meaning there are two separate "app optimization" settings: one within the Smart Manager app, and the other within the battery usage screen), Now on Tap to quickly access the intelligent personal assistant Google Now, and Permission Control to limit the permissions granted to a particular application.

TouchWiz Grace UX

First released with the Samsung Galaxy Note 7 for Android Marshmallow, the Grace UX was named after the device's codename, and eventually made its way to older devices, including the Galaxy Note 5 through an update, the Galaxy S7 and S7 Edge through the official Android Nougat update. The Grace UX features a cleaner, flatter look to iconography and extensive use of white space. TouchWiz Grace UX devices also benefit from the Secure Folder functionality, which enables users to keep certain data, and even apps, behind a secure password.

In addition, for most countries, all the languages that were absent from previous versions (Android Marshmallow or earlier) will be available in this release, starting with the Galaxy Tab S3.

Devices running Samsung TouchWiz

Proprietary
Samsung Champ
Samsung Impact/Highlight
Samsung Jet
Samsung Preston
Samsung Solstice
Samsung Corby
Samsung Star
Samsung Tocco
Samsung Ultra Touch
Samsung Blue Earth
Samsung Monte

Bada
Samsung Wave 575  (TouchWiz 3.0)
Samsung Wave S8500
Samsung Wave II S8530
Samsung Wave 723 (TouchWiz 3.0)
Samsung Wave 525 (TouchWiz 3.0)
Samsung Wave Y
Samsung Wave 3 (TouchWiz 4.0)

Windows Mobile
Samsung Omnia II

Symbian
Samsung i8910

Tizen
Samsung Z1
Samsung Z3

Android

Cameras
Samsung Galaxy Camera (TouchWiz Nature UX)
Samsung Galaxy NX (TouchWiz Nature UX 2.0)
Samsung Galaxy Camera 2 (TouchWiz Nature UX 2.5)

Smartphones
Samsung Behold II
Samsung Illusion SCH-I110 (TouchWiz 3.0)
Samsung Infuse 4G (TouchWiz 3.0)
Samsung Rugby Smart (TouchWiz 3.0)
Samsung Droid Charge (TouchWiz 4.0, Upgradable to TouchWiz Nature UX)
Samsung Galaxy Chat (TouchWiz Nature UX)
Samsung Galaxy Gio (TouchWiz 3.0)
Samsung Galaxy Fit (TouchWiz 3.0)
Samsung Galaxy Mini (TouchWiz 3.0)
Samsung Galaxy Mini 2 (TouchWiz 4.0, Upgradable to TouchWiz Nature UX)
Samsung Galaxy 3 GT-i5800 (TouchWiz 3.0)
Samsung Galaxy 5 GT-i5500 (TouchWiz 3.0)
Samsung Captivate Glide (TouchWiz 4.0)
Samsung Gravity Smart (TouchWiz 3.0)
Samsung Exhibit II 4G (TouchWiz 4.0)
Samsung Galaxy Y (TouchWiz 3.0, Upgradable to TouchWiz 4.0)
Samsung Galaxy W (TouchWiz 4.0)
Samsung Galaxy Light (TouchWiz 4.0)
Samsung Galaxy J1 (2016) (TouchWiz Nature UX 5.0)
Samsung Galaxy Ace (TouchWiz 3.0)
Samsung Galaxy Ace Plus (TouchWiz 4.0)
Samsung Galaxy Ace 2 (TouchWiz 4.0, Upgradable to TouchWiz Nature UX)
Samsung Galaxy Ace 3 (TouchWiz Nature UX 2.0, Upgradable to TouchWiz Nature UX 2.5)
Samsung Galaxy Ace Style/Ace 4/Ace 4 Neo (TouchWiz Essence UX)
Samsung Galaxy Express (TouchWiz Nature UX)
Samsung Galaxy Grand (TouchWiz Nature UX, Upgradable to Nature UX 2.0)
Samsung Galaxy Grand Prime (TouchWiz Essence UX)
Samsung Galaxy K Zoom (TouchWiz Nature UX 3.0)
Samsung Galaxy Premier (TouchWiz Nature UX)
Samsung Galaxy Prevail 2 (TouchWiz Nature UX)
Samsung Galaxy Pro (TouchWiz 3.0)
Samsung Galaxy Proclaim (TouchWiz 3.0 Lite)
Samsung Galaxy Pocket 2 (TouchWiz Essence UX)
Samsung Galaxy Pocket Neo (TouchWiz Nature UX 2.0)
Samsung Galaxy Young (TouchWiz Nature UX)
Samsung Galaxy Young 2 (TouchWiz Essence UX)
Samsung Galaxy Fame (TouchWiz Nature UX)
Samsung Galaxy S (TouchWiz 3.0, Upgradable to TouchWiz 4.0)
Samsung Galaxy S Blaze 4G (TouchWiz 4.0)
Samsung Galaxy S Duos (TouchWiz Nature UX)
Samsung Galaxy S Duos 2 (TouchWiz Nature UX 2.0)
Samsung Galaxy SL (TouchWiz 3.0, Upgradable to TouchWiz 4.0)
Samsung Galaxy S Plus (TouchWiz 3.0, Upgradable to TouchWiz 4.0)
Samsung Galaxy S Advance (TouchWiz 4.0, Upgradable to TouchWiz Nature UX 2.0)
Samsung Galaxy S II (TouchWiz 4.0, Upgradable to TouchWiz Nature UX (4.1.2))
S II Skyrocket (TouchWiz 4.0, Upgradable to TouchWiz Nature UX)
Samsung Galaxy S II Plus (TouchWiz Nature UX, Upgradable to TouchWiz Nature UX 2.0)
Samsung Galaxy S III/S III Mini/Samsung Galaxy S III Neo (TouchWiz Nature UX, Upgradable to TouchWiz Nature UX 2.5 (4.4.2 - S III/Neo), TouchWiz Nature UX 2.0 (S III Mini VE))
S4 Mini i919X/S4 Zoom/S4 LTE-A (GT-i9506) (TouchWiz Nature UX 2.0, Upgradable to TouchWiz Nature UX 4.0)
Samsung Galaxy S5/S5 Mini (TouchWiz Nature UX 3.0, Upgradable to TouchWiz Nature UX 5.0 (S5 Mini), TouchWiz 6.0 (Galaxy S5/S5 Mini))
Samsung Galaxy S6/S6 Edge (TouchWiz Nature UX 5.0 (5.0.2), upgradeable to Grace UX (7.0))
Samsung Galaxy Star S5282/S5280 (TouchWiz Nature UX)
Samsung Galaxy J1 Ace Neo (TouchWiz Nature UX 5.0)
Samsung Galaxy Star 2/Star 2 Plus (TouchWiz Essence UX)
Samsung Galaxy Win (TouchWiz Nature UX 2.0)
Samsung Galaxy Core (TouchWiz Nature UX 2.0, Upgradable to TouchWiz Nature UX 2.5)
Samsung Galaxy Core 2 (TouchWiz Essence UX)
Samsung Galaxy J1 (TouchWiz Essence UX)
Samsung Galaxy J7 (TouchWiz Nature UX 5.0 (5.1.1), upgradeable to TouchWiz 6.0 (6.0.1))
Samsung Galaxy J1 Ace (TouchWiz Essence UX (4.4.4))
Samsung Galaxy Trend Plus (TouchWiz Nature UX 2.0)
Samsung Galaxy S Duos 3/VE (TouchWiz Essence UX (4.4.4))
Samsung Exhibit 4G (TouchWiz 3.0)
Samsung Galaxy Alpha (Touchwiz Nature UX 3.0 (4.4.4), Upgradable to TouchWiz Nature UX 3.5 (4.4.4) and 5.0 (5.0.2))
Samsung Galaxy A3/Samsung Galaxy A5/Samsung Galaxy A7 (TouchWiz Nature UX 3.5 (4.4.4), Upgradable to TouchWiz Nature UX 5.0 (5.0.2) & TouchWiz 6.0 (6.0.1))
Samsung Galaxy A3 (2016)/Samsung Galaxy A5 (2016)/Samsung Galaxy A7 (2016)/Samsung Galaxy A9 (2016) (TouchWiz Nature UX 5.0, upgradeable to Touchwiz 6.0 & Grace UX (7.0))
Samsung Galaxy J1 Ace VE (TouchWiz Nature UX 5.0)
Samsung Galaxy A9 Pro (2016) (TouchWiz 6.0 (6.0.1))
Samsung Galaxy J1 Mini (TouchWiz Nature UX 5.0 (5.1.1))
Samsung Galaxy J2 (2016) (TouchWiz 6.0 (6.0.1))
Samsung Galaxy A8 (TouchWiz Nature UX 5.0 (5.1.1), Upgradeable to TouchWiz 6.0 (6.0.1))
Samsung Galaxy E5/Samsung Galaxy E7 (TouchWiz Nature UX 3.5 (4.4.4), Upgradable to TouchWiz Nature UX 5.0 (5.1.1))
Samsung Galaxy J2 Pro (TouchWiz 6.0 (6.0.1))
Samsung Galaxy V Plus (TouchWiz Essence UX (4.4.4))
Samsung Galaxy J2 (TouchWiz Nature UX 5.0 (5.1.1))
Samsung Galaxy J3 (2016) (TouchWiz 5.0) (5.1.1)
Samsung Galaxy Active Neo (TouchWiz Nature UX 5.0 (5.1.1))
Samsung Galaxy J5 (TouchWiz Nature UX 5.0 (5.1.1), Upgradable to TouchWiz 6.0 (6.0.1))
Samsung Galaxy Trend 2 Lite (TouchWiz Essence UX (4.4.4))
Samsung Galaxy On5/On7 (Touchwiz Nature UX 5.0 (5.1.1))
Samsung Galaxy S7/S7 Edge (TouchWiz 6.0 (6.0.1), upgradable to TouchWiz Grace UX (7.0))
Samsung Galaxy A8 (2016) (TouchWiz Grace UX (6.0.1))
Samsung Galaxy A3 (2017)/Samsung Galaxy A5 (2017)/Samsung Galaxy A7 (2017) (TouchWiz Grace UX (6.0.1))
Samsung Galaxy J1 mini Prime (TouchWiz 6.0 (6.0.1))
Samsung Galaxy J2 Prime (TouchWiz Grace UX (6.0.1))

Phablets
Samsung Galaxy Grand 2 (TouchWiz Nature UX 2.5 (4.3/4.4.2))
Samsung Galaxy S4/Samsung Galaxy S4 Value Edition/S4 Active (TouchWiz Nature UX 2.0, Upgradable to TouchWiz Nature UX 4.0)
Samsung Galaxy Mega 5.8 i9150 (TouchWiz Nature UX 2.0 (4.2.2), Upgradable to TouchWiz Nature UX 2.5 (4.4.2))
Samsung Galaxy Mega 6.3 GT-i9200/i9205 (TouchWiz Nature UX 2.0 (4.2.2), Upgradable to TouchWiz Nature UX 2.5 (4.4.2))
Samsung Galaxy Mega 2 (TouchWiz Nature UX 3.0 (4.4.4))
Samsung Galaxy Note (TouchWiz 4.0 (2.3.3), Upgradable to TouchWiz Nature UX (4.1.2))
Samsung Galaxy Note II SM-N7100 and SM-N7105/N7106 (TouchWiz Nature UX (4.1.1), Upgradable to TouchWiz Nature UX 2.5 (4.4.2))
Samsung Galaxy Note 3 (TouchWiz Nature UX 2.5 (4.3/4.4.2), Upgradable to TouchWiz Nature UX 3.5 (5.0))
Samsung Galaxy Note 4 (TouchWiz Nature UX 3.0 (4.4.4), Upgradable to TouchWiz Nature UX 3.5 (5.0.1) and TouchWiz Nature UX 5.0 (5.1) TouchWiz 6.0 (6.0.1))
Samsung Galaxy Note 5 (TouchWiz Nature UX 5.0 (5.1.1), Upgradable to TouchWiz Grace UX (6.0.1))
Samsung Galaxy Note 7 (TouchWiz Grace UX (6.0.1))
Samsung Galaxy Round (TouchWiz Nature UX 2.5 (4.3))
Samsung Galaxy S6 Edge+ (TouchWiz Nature UX 5.0 (5.1.1), upgradeable to TouchWiz Nature UX 6.0 (6.0.1))

Tablets
Samsung Galaxy Tab 7.0 (TouchWiz 3.0, Upgradable to TouchWiz 4.0)
Samsung Galaxy Tab 7.0 Plus (TouchWiz 4.0, Upgradable to TouchWiz Nature UX)
Samsung Galaxy Tab 2 7.0 (TouchWiz Nature UX Lite, Upgradable to TouchWiz Nature UX 2.0)
Samsung Galaxy Tab 3 7.0 (TouchWiz Nature UX, Upgradable to TouchWiz Nature UX 2.5)
Samsung Galaxy Tab 4 7.0 (Touchwiz Nature UX 3.0)
Samsung Galaxy Tab 7.7 (TouchWiz 4.0, Upgradable to TouchWiz Nature UX)
Samsung Galaxy Tab 3 8.0 (TouchWiz Nature UX 2.0, Upgradable to TouchWiz Nature UX 2.5)
Samsung Galaxy Tab 4 8.0 (Touchwiz Nature UX 3.0)
Samsung Galaxy Tab 8.9 (TouchWiz 4.0, Upgradable to TouchWiz Nature UX)
Samsung Galaxy Tab 10.1 (TouchWiz 4.0, Upgrading TouchWiz Nature UX)
Samsung Galaxy Tab 2 10.1 (TouchWiz Nature UX Lite, Upgradable to TouchWiz Nature UX)
Samsung Galaxy Tab 3 10.1 (TouchWiz Nature UX, Upgradable to TouchWiz Nature UX 2.5)
Samsung Galaxy Tab 4 10.1 (Touchwiz Nature UX 3.0)
Samsung Galaxy Note 8.0 (TouchWiz Nature UX, upgradable to TouchWiz Nature UX 2.0 (4.2.2) and TouchWiz Nature UX 3.0 (4.4.2))
Samsung Galaxy Note 10.1 (TouchWiz Nature UX Lite, upgradable to TouchWiz Nature UX, TouchWiz Nature UX 2.5)
Samsung Galaxy Note 10.1 2014 Edition (TouchWiz Nature UX 2.5, upgradable to TouchWiz Nature UX 3.0, TouchWiz Nature UX 5.0)
Samsung Galaxy Note Pro 12.2 (TouchWiz Nature UX 3.0, Upgradeable To TouchWiz Nature UX 3.5)
Samsung Galaxy Tab S 8.4 (TouchWiz Nature UX 3.0 Upgradeable to TouchWiz Nature UX 3.5, TouchWiz 6.0)
Samsung Galaxy Tab S 10.5 (TouchWiz Nature UX 3.0 Upgradeable to TouchWiz Nature UX 3.5, TouchWiz 6.0)
Samsung Galaxy Tab S2 (TouchWiz Essence UX 2.0 upgradeable to TouchWiz UX 6.0)
Samsung Galaxy Tab S3 (TouchWiz Grace UX)
Samsung Galaxy Tab A 8.0 (TouchWiz Essence UX 2.0 upgradeable to Samsung Experience 8)
Samsung Galaxy Tab A 9.7 (TouchWiz 5.0 (Essence) upgradeable to Samsung Experience 8)
Samsung Galaxy Tab E (TouchWiz Nature 5.0 (Essence) upgradeable to Samsung Experience 8)

Recent TouchWiz Versions

References

Android (operating system) software
Custom Android firmware
Mobile operating systems
Samsung software
User interface techniques